The Mustafa Kemal Atatürk Monument in Yehud, Israel is a monument dedicated to Mustafa Kemal Atatürk founder of the Turkish Republic.

Location
The monument is located in front of the Arkadaş Association in Yehud-Monosson, Israel.

Description
The monument consists of a bust of Atatürk on a marble foundation. On the foundation of the monument under "Mustafa Kemal Atatürk" and "1881-1938" it has his famous quote:  in its original Turkish and his signature. Under that it says:

History
It was unveiled 2 November 2007 in the presence of Turkish Ambassador Namık Tan.

References

Yehud
Monuments and memorials in Israel
Buildings and structures in Central District (Israel)